Naron or Naro, Narona may refer to:

 Naron, exo-planet HD 206610 b on constellation of Aquarius
 Narón, a municipality in Galicia, Spain.
 Naron, Iran
 Narona, village in Croatia
 Narona, gastropod
 Narona, exopleura
 Narona, clavaltula